K. P. Shashika Udari Perera (born 23 April 1984), popularly known as Udari Perera, is a Sri Lankan film actress and model. In 2016, she won the title Mrs. Sri Lanka and subsequently participated in the Mrs. Universe pageant.

Personal life 
Udari has two younger sisters – Purnima and Shehani. She is married to Prasad Ranasinghe and the couple has one son, Jaydon. Purnima Perera is an air hostess. Her younger sister Shehani Perera is an actress who played the lead roles in two films Face to Pace and Ethalaya. Udari completed education from St. Anne's Balika Maha Vidyalaya, Wattala.

She worked as an air hostess before entering cinema.

Mrs Universe 2016 
In 2016 Udari won the title of Mrs. Sri Lanka, at the national Mrs. Universe pageant held on 17 August 2016 at Ramada Hotel, Colombo and represented the country at the Mrs. Universe pageant in Guangzhou, China on 23 August 2016.

Career 
She is best known for her appearance in Ran Ran Ran Sela Anda of Iraj and Sangeeth's music video in 2007. She debuted acting in the television serial Sinindu Piyapath with a minor role. Her film debut was in Pravegaya, which was released in 2015 opposite to Hemal Ranasinghe.

Filmography

Television serials 
 Sinindu Piyapath as Saroja
 Iththo

Awards 
 Hiru Golden Film Awards - Most Popular Actress - 2016

References

External links

 Gossip Chat With Actress Udari Perera
 කාන්තාවක් සමග කෙහෙවලු පටලාගත් ජනප්‍රිය නිළි උදාරි පෙරේරා එළියට ඇද දමලා
 පියුමි හංසමාලිගේ කටකතා ගැන උදාරි කථා කරයි

Living people
Sri Lankan film actresses
Sri Lankan television actresses
1984 births